The Bacteroidaceae are a family of environmental bacteria. Bacteroides is common in the human gastrointestinal microbiotia.

References

Bacteroidia